User model may refer to:
User modeling
User interface modeling

See also
Adaptive hypermedia
Web personalisation
 User modeling
 User profile